The 1956 Oregon Webfoots football team represented the University of Oregon as a member of the Pacific Coast Conference (PCC) during the 1956 NCAA University Division football season. In their sixth season under head coach Len Casanova, the Webfoots compiled a 4–4–2 record (3–3–2 against PCC opponents), finished in fifth place in the PCC, and outscored their opponents, 133 to 102. The team played home games at Hayward Field in Eugene, Oregon and Multnomah Stadium in Portland, Oregon.

The team's statistical leaders included Tom Crabtree with 366 passing yards, Jack Morris with 519 rushing yards, and Jim Shanley with 173 receiving yards.

Schedule

References

Oregon
Oregon Ducks football seasons
Oregon Webfoots football